Bandar Baru Sentul is a major area located within the east side of the suburb of Sentul, Kuala Lumpur.

References

Geography of Kuala Lumpur
Townships